Ambergate is a semi-rural suburb of the city of Busselton in the South West region of Western Australia. At the 2021 census, it had a population of 564.

After European settlement, the community began to develop as part of the Group Settlement Scheme, with a school being open from 1924 to 1941 and a hall (which was also used as the school building) being constructed in 1935. It was established as a bounded locality in 1987, with its boundaries being modified in 1998 to follow cadastral and hydrographic boundaries. The suburb has been earmarked for urban development.

References 

Suburbs of Busselton